Reginald Roy Liston (1896-1977) was an Australian rugby league player who played in the 1910s and 1920s.

Playing career
Liston's rugby league career began after returning from the Western Front in World War I. In 1920, Roy Liston turned our for Annandale in the club's final year in 1920. He then transferred to Balmain Tigers for two years between 1921-1922. He switched to Glebe in 1923, before returning to Balmain the following year and won the premiership with them in the 1924 Grand Final. He lastly joined Western Suburbs Magpies for three seasons between 1926-1928.

Liston died on 13 August 1977, aged 81.

References

1896 births
1977 deaths
Balmain Tigers players
Annandale rugby league players
Glebe rugby league players
Western Suburbs Magpies players
Australian military personnel of World War I
Australian rugby league players
Rugby league props
Date of birth missing
Rugby league players from Sydney